The 2012–13 SIJHL season was the 12th season of the Superior International Junior Hockey League (SIJHL). The seven teams of the SIJHL were to play 56-game schedules.

Come February, the top teams of the league will play down for the Bill Salonen Cup, the SIJHL championship.  The winner of the Bill Salonen Cup will compete in the Central Canadian Junior "A" championship, the Dudley Hewitt Cup.  If successful against the winners of the Ontario Junior Hockey League and Northern Ontario Junior Hockey League, the champion would then move on to play in the Canadian Junior Hockey League championship, the 2013 Royal Bank Cup.

Changes 
Iron Range Ironheads become Minnesota Iron Rangers and relocate to Hoyt Lakes, Minnesota.
Wisconsin Wilderness become Minnesota Wilderness and relocate to Cloquet, Minnesota.
Sioux Lookout Flyers announce withdrawal from 2012-13 season on October 3, 2012.
Duluth Clydesdales removed from league on January 20, 2012 due to player loss.

Final standings
Note: GP = Games played; W = Wins; L = Losses; OTL = Overtime losses; SL = Shootout losses; GF = Goals for; GA = Goals against; PTS = Points; x = clinched playoff berth; y = clinched division title; z = clinched conference title

Sioux Lookout left the league after only 3 games, schedule was reorganized without them.  Duluth's franchise was revoked by the league after 36 games, leaving 20 games unplayed, these are listed as 1-0 forfeit losses by the league.

Teams listed on the official league website.

Standings listed on official league website.

2012-13 Bill Salonen Cup Playoffs

Playoff results are listed on the official league website.

Dudley Hewitt Cup Championship
Hosted by the North Bay Trappers in North Bay, Ontario.  Minnesota Wilderness win the event.

Round Robin
North Bay Trappers (NOJHL) 4 - Minnesota Wilderness 1
Minnesota Wilderness 7 - Soo Thunderbirds (NOJHL) 0
Minnesota Wilderness 3 - St. Michael's Buzzers (OJHL) 0

Final
Minnesota Wilderness 4 - St. Michael's Buzzers (OJHL) 3 OT

2013 Royal Bank Cup Championship
Hosted by the Summerside Western Capitals in Summerside, Prince Edward Island. Minnesota Wilderness lost semi-final.

Round Robin
Summerside Western Capitals (MHL) 5 - Minnesota Wilderness 1
Brooks Bandits (AJHL) 6 - Minnesota Wilderness 3
Minnesota Wilderness 5 - Truro Bearcats (MHL) 3
Surrey Eagles (BCHL) 5 - Minnesota Wilderness 2

Semi-final
Brooks Bandits (AJHL) 5 - Minnesota Wilderness 4 OT

Scoring leaders 
Note: GP = Games played; G = Goals; A = Assists; Pts = Points; PIM = Penalty minutes

Leading goaltenders 
Note: Minimum 1000 minutes; GP = Games played; Mins = Minutes played; W = Wins; L = Losses: OTL = Overtime losses; SL = Shootout losses; GA = Goals Allowed; SO = Shutouts; GAA = Goals against average

Awards
SIJHL Most Valuable Player - Mike Dietrich (Minnesota Wilderness)
Top Goaltender - Gordy Defiel (Minnesota Wilderness)
Best Defensive Forward - Jeremy Johnson (Minnesota Wilderness)
Rookie of the Year - Jake Larson (Minnesota Wilderness)
Top Defenceman - Len Pelletier (Dryden Ice Dogs)
Most Improved Player - Colton Spicer (Fort Frances Lakers)
Most Sportsmanlike Player - Jacob Nolan (Fort Frances Lakers)
Top Scorer - Mike Dietrich (Minnesota Wilderness)
Co-Coach of the Year - Rod Aldoff (Minnesota Wilderness)/Chris Walby (Minnesota Iron Rangers)
Scholastic Award - Joel Bogacki (Fort Frances Lakers)
Gary Cook Memorial Executive of the Year - Trevor Hosanna (Hockey Northwestern Ontario)
Playoff Most Valuable Player - Mike Dietrich (Minnesota Wilderness)

See also 
 2013 Royal Bank Cup
 Dudley Hewitt Cup
 Ontario Junior Hockey League
 Northern Ontario Junior Hockey League
 Greater Ontario Junior Hockey League
 2012 in ice hockey
 2013 in ice hockey

References

External links 
 Official website of the Superior International Junior Hockey League
 Official website of the Canadian Junior Hockey League

Superior International Junior Hockey League seasons
SIJHL
SIJHL